Yuanzhou District is the only district and the seat of the city of Yichun, Jiangxi province, China, bordering Hunan province to the northwest.

Administrative divisions
Yuanzhou District currently has 9 subdistricts, 17 towns and 5 townships. 
9 subdistricts

17 towns

5 townships

References

County-level divisions of Jiangxi